Scott Christopher Thornton (born January 9, 1971) is a Canadian former professional ice hockey winger who played in the National Hockey League. Scott and former Sharks teammate Joe Thornton are first cousins.

Playing career
Thornton was drafted in the first round (third overall) by the Toronto Maple Leafs in the 1989 NHL Entry Draft. He played thirty-three games for the team his rookie season, accumulating one goal and three assists.  He also played left wing for the Edmonton Oilers, Montreal Canadiens, Dallas Stars and San Jose Sharks. He was signed by San Jose as a free agent on July 1, 2000.  In his first season with San Jose, he had a career year, scoring twenty goals playing alongside gritty centre Mike Ricci.

He signed a two-year contract $3.42 million contract extension in the 2003–04 season.  The first season of the extension coincided with the 2004–05 NHL lockout, and after the second year, Thornton became an unrestricted free agent when the Sharks declined to pick up the one-year team option in his contract. On July 1, 2006, he signed a 2-year, $3 million contract with the Los Angeles Kings. During the 2006–07 season, Thornton was placed on injured reserve due to a wrist injury and missed 23 games as a result.

Thornton announced his retirement on July 28, 2008.

Personal

Since retirement Thornton currently resides in Collingwood, Ontario.

Career statistics

Regular season and playoffs

International

See also
Notable families in the NHL

References

External links

1971 births
Living people
Battle of the Blades participants
Belleville Bulls players
Canadian ice hockey centres
Cape Breton Oilers players
Dallas Stars players
Edmonton Oilers players
Ice hockey people from Ontario
Los Angeles Kings players
Montreal Canadiens players
National Hockey League first-round draft picks
Newmarket Saints players
San Jose Sharks players
Södertälje SK players
Sportspeople from London, Ontario
Toronto Maple Leafs draft picks
Toronto Maple Leafs players
Canadian expatriate ice hockey players in Sweden